Larry Van Kriedt (born July 4, 1954) is an American-born Australian jazz musician. He is best known for being the original bassist for the rock band AC/DC around November 1973, joining Malcolm Young (rhythm guitar), Angus Young (lead guitar), Dave Evans (lead vocals) and Colin Burgess (drums). He was replaced in February 1974. Van Kriedt also plays saxophone, guitar and vocals.

Early life

Van Kriedt was born to a multi-instrumental family in San Francisco on July 4, 1954. His father was the renowned jazz musician David van Kriedt who composed, arranged played and recorded with such artists as Dave Brubeck, Paul Desmond, Stan Kenton and many more. All of Larry’s life has been centered on music, particularly jazz. He began playing the double bass at age 9, guitar at 12, and added saxophone and vocals to the list at 15. He studied jazz, harmony, composition and musical arrangement with his father.

In 1969, at age 15, his family moved to Sydney, New South Wales, Australia where he met Angus Young shortly after arrival. He started hanging out with Angus and his brother, Malcolm Young. Van Kriedt is described as being an accomplished jazz-influenced guitarist during this period. One of his first studio sessions was as the bassist in the original line-up of AC/DC in 1973.

AC/DC

In November 1973 he was asked to join the brand new band AC/DC by Malcolm Young. Shortly after, lead singer Dave Evans, drummer Colin Burgess and guitarist Angus Young joined. On December 31, 1973 the band performed their first ever live show. Four months later the band recorded the single "Can I Sit Next to You, Girl", although shortly afterwards Van Kriedt was fired and his bass lines were said to have been re-recorded by George Young (one of the older brothers of Malcolm and Angus). After this, he was replaced by Neil Smith. AC/DC employed a succession of bass players over the following few months.

In January 1975 after Rob Bailey was fired, Paul Matters joined the group as bassist for live shows but his tenure was short-lived, being replaced by Mark Evans in March 1975. Until Axl Rose joined as a guest vocalist in 2016, Van Kriedt had been the only member in the group's history to be born in the US.

Other bands
Van Kriedt created his own band called Non Stop Dancers with Kevin Jones (guitar, vocals), Jane Stewart (keyboards), Karen Steains (bass), and Brett Van Kriedt (drums). They released one full length album, Surprise Surprise, in 1984.

Personal life
From 1997 to 1999, he lived in Morocco, working there as a musician with his band Afram doing radio, television and concerts such as the first Gnawa Festival in Essaouira in 1998, and raising money for the charity, B.A.Y.T.I.  After leaving Morocco he travelled the world busking, that is, playing jazz on the street from London to Provence to Sydney. This was when he started making backing tracks of jazz standards.

In 2002, Van Kriedt pioneered the first online downloadable jazz playalong backing track e-business, Jazzbacks.com.

In 2007, he worked with Paul Agbakoba in The LPs.

References

Further reading
 "AC/DC Maximum Rock & Roll", Murray Englehart with Arnaud Durieux, 2007
 "Two Sides To Every Glory", Paul Stenning, 2005
 "Metal Hammer & Classic Rock present AC/DC", Metal Hammer magazine special, 2005

External links
AC/DC
http://www.jazzbacks.com
http://www.soulbacks.com

1954 births
AC/DC members
Naturalised citizens of Australia
Living people
American expatriates in Australia
American street performers
American rock bass guitarists
American male bass guitarists
Guitarists from San Francisco
Australian rock bass guitarists
Australian saxophonists
Male saxophonists
American rock saxophonists
American male saxophonists
20th-century American guitarists
21st-century saxophonists
Australian male guitarists